Hari Prasad Pradhan was a Nepalese judge who served as 1st and 3rd Chief Justice of Nepal, in office between 10 August 1951 and 20 May 1956 and 14 December 1961 and 15 December 1963. He was the first Chief Justice of Nepal and the only jurist to hold the position for two terms. He was also the Chief Justice to allow woman lawyers in the country.

References 

Chief justices of Nepal
Possibly living people
Year of birth missing